Kordia jejudonensis is a Gram-negative, aerobic, non-spore-forming and rod-shaped bacterium from the genus Kordia.

References

Flavobacteria
Bacteria described in 2014